is a railway station operated by JR West on the Sanyō Main Line in Hikari, Yamaguchi. The station is located in the rural northern part of the Shimata area in Hikari, on the north side of the city's territory.

History

September 5, 1897: Station opens as part of the new Hiroshima-Tokuyama segment of the Sanyō Railway
December 1, 1906: Station is transferred to Japanese Government Railways as a part of railway nationalization
April 1, 1987: Station operation is taken over by JR West after privatization of Japanese National Railways

Layout
The station has three tracks, with two tracks devoted to passenger use. These two tracks lie on opposite sides of the station, each being served by a side platform. In between the two tracks there is a third track which connects to the other two, but is currently unused. The station building is located on the south side of the station, and there is a crossover connecting the two platforms.

Platforms

See also
 List of railway stations in Japan

External links

  

Railway stations in Japan opened in 1897
Sanyō Main Line
Hiroshima City Network
Railway stations in Yamaguchi Prefecture
Hikari, Yamaguchi